Masline is a suburb of Podgorica, Montenegro.

See also
List of Podgorica neighbourhoods and suburbs#Zlatica and Masline
Stadion Masline

References

Suburbs of Podgorica